St. Fidgeta & Other Parodies, a mostly uncategorizable spoof of 1960s Catholicism, was the first published work by John Bellairs. The original St. Fidgeta article first appeared in the Chicago-based Catholic magazine, the Critic. it describes the putative life of St. Fidgeta ("Quieter of the giggly / Steadier of the wiggly"), a seven year-old martyr and the patroness of unmanageable children. A subsequent book appeared with eleven other vignettes that offered sardonic comment on the Vatican II era.  Long out of print, St. Fidgeta was re-released in the 2009 anthology, Magic Mirrors, published by the New England Science Fiction Association press.

Author's Note
"I would like to thank my friends, Dale and Marilyn Fitschen, for all their help.  They suffered through endless readings from the Urtext and gave me many suggestions and ideas.  I would also like to thank my friend Bernard Kent Markwell, to whom St. Fidgeta first appeared on a rainy day in front of the Oriental Institute in Chicago. He was struck to the ground by the vision, and after he had rolled about for a bit, he got up and told me what he had seen. He also gave me many ideas: In fact, if you do not like some part of this book, you may attribute it to him."

St. Fidgeta
St. Fidgeta is the patron saint of nervous and fidgety children. She was born in 482 AD.  She was martyred by her teacher, the notorious pagan skeptic Putricordes, whom she outraged by her unremitting and unrelenting piety; he slapped her to death in 490 AD. St. Fidgeta saved the city of Pinsk from certain destruction by a Turkish army in 1450. Appearing as a fluffy pink cloud on the Pinsk walls, she "induced in the heathen army a state of uneasiness", forcing the soldiers of the Prophet to retreat.

References
 Susanne Washburn. "The marvelous St. Fidgeta", National Catholic Reporter, 29 October 2004.

External links

Satirical works